Logical Position is a digital marketing and SEO company based in Lake Oswego, Oregon with other offices in the United States.

Background
Logical Position was founded by Michael Weinhouse in 2009. The company specializes in pay-per-click management (PPC) and search engine optimization (SEO) along with offering web design and graphic design services.

Growth
Logical Position has grown rapidly since its founding growing 793% between 2010 and 2015. In 2015, the company continued its growth by acquiring Virtue Advertising in Chicago and TQE Marketing in Oregon. It ranked in Inc. Magazine’s list of 5000 Fastest Growing Private Companies in America.  The company has also been listed in the top 20 of Portland Business Journal’s list of Fastest Growing Private Companies.

Culture
Logical Position has received awards for its company culture. It ranked #3 in Inc. Magazine’s list of Best Workplaces in America (2017). The Oregonian ranked it as a Top Workplace (2013, 2015, 2016, 2017). It appeared in Oregon Business’s list of 100 Best Companies.

Industry recognition  
Bing named it Partner of the Year for the Americas in 2018. It was also named Bing's Growth Channel Partner of the Year in 2017.

References 

Search engine optimization companies
Companies based in Lake Oswego, Oregon
American companies established in 2009